Bac Beag is a Scottish island, one of the Treshnish Isles in the Inner Hebrides.

Origin of name

The Gaelic name has several possible interpretations. The meaning of Beag clearly means “small” (as opposed to Bac Mòr, its larger sister), but the word Bac can mean either a "bank", or an "obstacle" or "hindrance".

Geography
Bac Beag, along with its sister island, Bac Mor, lies south of Lunga, and is at the south-western end of the Treshnish Isles’ chain. In contrast to Bac Mòr, Bac Beag is low-lying and fairly flat. It is of volcanic origin.

Wildlife

Like the other Treshnish Isles, Bac Beag is uninhabited and is owned by a charity, the Hebridean Trust. The Treshnish Isles are designated a Site of Special Scientific Interest and a Special Protection Area due to their importance for breeding seabirds.

References

Treshnish Isles
Uninhabited islands of Argyll and Bute